Bolivia is a country in South America, bordered by Brazil to the north and east, Paraguay and Argentina to the south, Chile to the west, and Peru to the west.

The cultural development of what is now Bolivia is divided into three distinct periods: pre-Columbian, colonial, and republican. Important archaeological ruins, gold and silver ornaments, stone monuments, ceramics, and weavings remain from several important pre-Columbian cultures. Major ruins include Tiwanaku, Samaipata, Inkallaqta and Iskanwaya. The country abounds in other sites that are difficult to reach and hardly explored by archaeologists.

The Spanish brought their own tradition of religious art which, in the hands of local indigenous and mestizo builders and artisans, developed into a rich and distinctive style of architecture, literature, and sculpture known as "Mestizo Baroque." The colonial period produced not only the paintings of Perez de Holguin, Flores, Bitti, and others, but also the works of skilled but unknown stonecutters, woodcarvers, goldsmiths, and silversmiths. An important body of native baroque religious music of the colonial period was recovered in recent years and has been performed internationally to wide acclaim since 1994. Bolivian artists of stature in the 20th century include, among others, Guzman de Rojas, Arturo Borda, María Luisa Pacheco, Master William Vega, Alfredo Da Silva, and Marina Núñez del Prado.

Festivals
Pagan rites from the pre-Columbian era are still common during the religious festivals of the Natives. The clothing used during the festivals is reminiscent of the dress of pre-Columbian Indians and 16th century Spaniards. The at the annual carnival of Oruro are among the great folkloric events of South America, as are the lesser known indigenous Anata Andina and the "carnival" at Tarabuco (Pujllay), or the Tinku - fertility rites held at Macha every 3 May.

They also celebrate Dia de los Muertos.

Dances
 
Many dances and songs contain elements from both the native and European cultures. Caporales seems to be the most popular Bolivian dance of present times – in a few decades it has developed into an enormously popular dance, not only in the Highlands where it originated, but also in the Lowlands and in Bolivian communities outside the country. In the Highlands, other traditional and still very popular dances are: 

 Awki awki
 Cambitas
 Ch'utas
 Diablada
 Kullawada
 Llamerada
 Morenada
 Pukllay
 Afro-Bolivian Saya
 Siklla (Wayra, Doctorcitos)
 Suri Sikuri
 Tango
 Tinku
 Tobas
 Waka Waka 
In the Lowlands, there are:
 Macheteros
 Taquirari
 Chovena

Clothing

Clothing of Andean people of indigenous descent includes the pollera (pleated-skirt), the 19th century European bowler hat, and a silky shawl known as a manta. The pollera was originally a simple Spanish dress that colonial authorities forced the indigenous populations to wear. The pollera is a symbol of pride for the indigenous people, who live in La Paz, and for people in rural areas.
 
The inhabitants of Santa Cruz de la Sierra, from babies to seniors, wear the same kind of clothes that are typical in western countries, like jeans, shorts (which are the most common because of the heat), t-shirts, dresses, etc.

Sports

Association football is the most popular sport in Bolivia. The governing body of football in Bolivia is the Federación Boliviana de Fútbol (FBF), which controls the national teams. The FBF organises the men's, women's, and futsal national teams.

The Bolivia national football team is currently ranked 75th in the world, with their best FIFA ranking being 18th in the world. The national team has competed at the FIFA World Cup three times, the Copa América 23 times, and the Confederations Cup once.

La Paz has the highest tournament-class golf course in the world.

Bolivia's national basketball team finished 8th at the 2016 South American Basketball Championship. There, Bolivia beat Ecuador 75-74 for its first victory ever at the event. Bolivia's women's national basketball team won the silver medal at the 1978 South American Basketball Championship for Women.

Cuisine

Bolivian cuisine stems mainly from the combination of Spanish cuisine with traditional native Bolivian ingredients, with later influences from Germans, Italians, Basques, Croats, Russians, and Poles, due to the arrival of immigrants from those countries. The three traditional staples of Bolivian cuisine are maize, potatoes, and beans. These ingredients have been combined with a number of staples brought by the Europeans, such as rice, wheat, and meat, such as beef, pork, and chicken.

Music

Bolivia's regional folk music is distinctive and varied. In the Andean regions, music is played during the festivals and dances. Some tunes contain strong Spanish influences.

The most common musical instruments are:
 Sicu (also sicus)
 Tarka or tharqa
 Pinkillo
 Skin drums
 Copper bells
 Wood
 Guitar
 Flute
 Zampoña
 Matraca
 Mandolina
 Charango
 Quena

See also

 Architecture of Bolivia
 Andean culture
 Hispanic culture
 Latin American culture
 Performing Life, Inc, NGO

References

External links
 Culture of Bolivia (languagecrossing.com)
 Languages spoken in Bolivia
 Culture of the Andes